Snapask is a Hong Kong-based online learning website that offers tutoring services to the students based in Hong Kong, Singapore, Thailand, Korea, Indonesia, Japan, Malaysia and Taiwan. Students could ask questions and tutors would answer them.

History 
Snapask was founded by Timothy Yu in January 2015. With its headquarters in Hong Kong, it expanded to Taiwan and Singapore in the year 2015.

In 2016, January, Snapask launched a new version Snapask 3.0, that was said to have better optimization with respect to the student-tutor matching mechanism to induce faster responses. According to Yu, this version included machine-learning algorithm to understand students’ study pattern.

In 2016, Snapask was awarded for the best team at the France Singapore ICT Awards 2016. In March 2016, Snapask became one of the companies to use Watson, a question answering (QA) computing system built by IBM, which involves advanced natural language processing, automated reasoning, information retrieval and knowledge representation.

In 2017 January, Snapask launched Snapask 4.0, which included concept-based quizzes, as an advanced feature.

As of June 2017, Snapask has a userbase of more than 300,000.

Snapask was one among the top 20 finalists at the 2017 EdTechXGlobal All Star Growth Awards.

Technology 
Snapask works as a mobile crowdsourcing platform that involves artificial intelligence and allows students to connect to tutors and receive instant one-on-one academic support. This app is said to address the questions and problems asked by its users within 15 seconds. Students are asked to take a picture of their queries and submit it to the platform; these questions are then, addressed by the tutors at Snapask.

References 

Education companies established in 2015
Internet properties established in 2015
Education companies of Hong Kong
Chinese educational websites

External links